Michael Pejic (born 25 January 1950) is a former England international footballer who played in the English Football League for Stoke City, Everton and  Aston Villa.

Pejic started his career with Stoke City under the management of Tony Waddington. He became an important player in Stoke's successful early 1970s side, helping the club win the League Cup in 1972. A left-back, he was renowned for being a tough player and was prone to being sent-off, and on one occasion was suspended for five matches. He broke his leg in February 1975, and in his absence City's genuine First Division title challenge fell away. He was sold to Everton for a £135,000 fee in February 1977, where he played three seasons before joining Aston Villa in 1979. He retired due to injury in 1980.

He later managed Leek Town, Northwich Victoria, Chester City, and Malaysian side Selangor FA, and also coached Port Vale from 1986 to 1992. In the late 2000s he coached at Plymouth Argyle and Ipswich Town.

Club career

Stoke City
Pejic was born in Chesterton in Newcastle-under-Lyme on Wednesday, 25 January 1950, and supported Stoke City from an early age. His father, a Serbian immigrant miner from Yugoslavia, took him to watch the matches at the Victoria Ground. In his teenage years Pejic was playing for Newcastle-under-Lyme schools as a left-winger and signed professional forms with Stoke in 1967, where manager Tony Waddington took the decision to convert him into a left-back. After two years in the reserves he made his debut against West Ham United at Upton Park, helping Stoke keep a clean sheet against World Cup winner Geoff Hurst. He took over from the disappointing Alex Elder and established himself in the first team. Pejic was a strong athlete with a sweet left foot and was compactly built at 5 ft 7in. Pejic was a 'hard player' and was a strong tackler who enjoyed letting his opposing winger know he was around with a scything tackle. He was a fitness fanatic who, unlike many of his Stoke teammates had another job outside of football, as he kept a farm near Leek.

He became a regular in the Stoke squad in 1969–70 and the early seasons in the 1970s. Stoke enjoyed a successful period, reaching the semi-final of the FA Cup twice and winning their first major trophy – the League Cup – in 1972. He played the whole ninety minutes of the final, as the "Potters" beat Chelsea 2–1 at Wembley thanks to goals from Terry Conroy and George Eastham. During two seasons, 1970–71 and 1971–72, Pejic played in over 100 senior matches. He earned a call up to the England national side in 1974, playing in four matches, but lost his place to Liverpool's Alec Lindsay. During his time at Stoke Pejic was prone to being sent-off and was once suspended for five matches by the FA. He broke his leg in February 1975, and injuries to three other key players caused Stoke's bid for the First Division title in 1974–75 to fall away to a fifth-place finish. In January 1976, the Butler Street stand roof at the Victoria Ground collapsed after a powerful storm gripped the area. To cover the costs the club had to sell their most valuable players and Pejic joined Everton for £135,000.

Everton
Under the stewardship of Gordon Lee, the "Toffees" finished in ninth place in 1976–77. They also reached the League Cup Final, but lost to Aston Villa at Old Trafford without Pejic in the team. He did though play 46 games in the 1977–78 season, as Everton finished third in the league. At Goodison Park, Pejic again suffered a broken leg this time against Leeds United in December 1978, and was limited to 26 appearances in the 1978–79 season.

Aston Villa
He was replaced by John Bailey at Everton and he joined Ron Saunders's Aston Villa in September 1979. But injuries again took their toll and he was limited to 12 appearances in the 1979–80 season before he decided to retire at Villa Park in May 1980 after being sidelined with a pelvic injury. The months of injuries and early retirement left him suffering from depression.

International career
Pejic won eight caps for the England under-23 team. Alf Ramsey handed him his full England debut in a friendly against Portugal in Lisbon on 3 April 1974; the game finished 0–0. After appearances against Wales and Northern Ireland, he won his fourth and final cap on 18 May 1974, in a 2–0 defeat to Scotland at Hampden Park that left England to share the 1973–74 British Home Championship. Ramsey's successor, Joe Mercer, dropped him in favour of Alec Lindsay.

Coaching career

Leek Town manager
Pejic took charge at North West Counties League side Leek Town, and led the "Blues" to a ninth-place finish in 1984–85. His stay at Harrison Park was brief, as he resigned to take over as manager of Northwich Victoria. He took the "Vics" to a 16th-place finish in the Alliance Premier League in 1985–86. He also ran a fruit and veg business.

Port Vale coach
He was appointed youth coach at Port Vale in July 1986, being promoted to first team coach in December 1987. He helped manager John Rudge to lead the club to promotion in 1988–89. However, he was sacked in March 1992, twelve months later an employment tribunal ruled that he had been unfairly dismissed and Vale were forced to pay a four-figure compensation sum.

Chester City manager
Pejic was named Chester City manager in June 1994 after the shock resignation of Graham Barrow. He inherited a very bare side after the loss of several key players, and an immediate relegation back to Third Division was inevitable after the side began the 1994–95 season without a point from their first seven games. Pejic was sacked in January 1995 after a 4–0 thrashing by York City at the Deva Stadium. He returned to Leek Town as caretaker-manager in 1998, before the appointment of Ernie Moss.

Later career
He went on to be the regional director for the North East FA and has coached such stars as Jermain Defoe, Aaron Lennon and Stewart Downing. He then taught FA coaching courses at NWHC in Nuneaton. In 1999, he managed Malaysian side Selangor FA. He also coached in Zimbabwe and Kuwait. In February 2007, he became Head of Youth Coaching at Championship side Plymouth Argyle. In June 2010 he left Argyle to take up a similar position at Ipswich Town. On 14 November 2010, Pejic was suspended from his coaching role at Ipswich Town after allegations of bullying.

Taekwondo career
He took up the martial art of taekwondo at the age of 62 and earned a place in the national team for the over 60 age group. 
In April 2019, he became the over 65's Taekwondo European champion after winning the gold medal in Antalya, Turkey.

Personal life
Pejic married in December 1970 and again in April 1991. He married his third wife, Marilyn – younger sister of singer Jackie Trent, in August 2017. His younger brother, Mel, played for Stoke City, Hereford United and Wrexham. Shaun Pejic, the son of Mel and nephew of Mike, was in the Wales under-21 team. Pejic worked as a co-commentator on Stoke City matches for local radio station for Signal 1. He also writes a column about Stoke in the Saturday edition of The Sentinel.

Career statistics

Club
Source:

International
Source:

Honours
Stoke City
League Cup: 1972
Watney Cup: 1974

England
British Home Championship: 1973–74 (shared)

References

1950 births
Living people
English people of Serbian descent
People from Chesterton, Staffordshire
English footballers
England under-23 international footballers
England international footballers
Association football defenders
Stoke City F.C. players
Everton F.C. players
Aston Villa F.C. players
English Football League players
English football managers
Leek Town F.C. managers
Northwich Victoria F.C. managers
Chester City F.C. managers
National League (English football) managers
Expatriate football managers in Malaysia
Association football coaches
Port Vale F.C. non-playing staff
Plymouth Argyle F.C. non-playing staff
Ipswich Town F.C. non-playing staff
English male taekwondo practitioners
English columnists